Lystra Eggert was born in September 1858 in Bayfield, Ontario. She attended grade school in the Bayfield area until 1866 when her family moved to Greensboro, North Carolina. It was here that Lystra began attending private schools. When she was finished with school, at the age of 19, she married a man by the name of John Birney Gretter, where she then took the name, Lystra Gretter. Her husband, John, was approximately twenty six years older and a veteran of the Confederate Army led by Robert E. Lee. In the year 1881, Lystra and John welcomed their first and only daughter, Mary.

In 1884, Lystra's husband John died, leaving her to raise their three-year-old daughter alone. In 1886, Lystra moved to Buffalo, New York with her mother and sister. It was then that she began attending school at the Buffalo General Hospital Training School for Nurses. Two years later, Lystra graduated with honors, well above many students in her class. Following graduation, she was given the position of Principal of the Farrand Training School for Nurses located in Detroit, Michigan at Harper Hospital.

From 1889 to 1907, she maintained the position of the Nursing School Superintendent. It was during this time that Lystra made changes that affected the training of nurses around the country. She was changing the nursing programs from one year to two years and later on, to three years. She did this to allow future nurses more time on the floor, thus gaining more experience. With all of her effort in the training field, Gretter was one of the main reasons that Michigan became the second state in the nation to require a nursing certification.

In 1908, Lystra was appointed Director of the Detroit Visiting Nurses Association. It was during this time that she found tuberculosis hospitals and also made way for the first free maternity and infant care clinics in Detroit, as well as made health screenings available to all school aged children.

Although Gretter made a huge impact on the nursing world, she is most commonly known for composing, in part, along with the Committee for the Farrand Training School for Nurses, the Nightingale Pledge in 1893. The pledge is a modified version of the Hippocratic Oath, and although modified in many ways, is still used by physicians today.

During her final years, Lystra helped in the gathering of nurses for the American Red Cross Nursing Service during both World Wars as well as maintained her position of the Detroit Visiting Nurses Association. She remained in Grosse Pointe, Michigan until she died in 1951.

In 2004, Lystra Gretter was inducted into the Michigan Women's Hall of Fame for the immense time and effort she put in promoting "nursing as a profession" during the 19th and 20th centuries.

References:

Munson, Helen. "Lystra E. Gretter." American Journal of Nursing. 6th ed. Vol. 49. Lippincott Williams & Wilkins, 1900. 344–348. Print.

Bissonnette, Tom. "1904–1913." Proud of Our Past, Preparing for Our Future; A History of the Michigan Nurses Association; 1904–2004. Paducah: Turner, 2004. 1–10. Print.

"Florence Nightingale: The Nightingale Pledge". Web. 6 December 2015.

"Nursing Pioneer Biography: Lystra Gretter." Nursing Pioneer Biography: Lystra Gretter. Web. 6 December 2015.

References

1858 births
1951 deaths
American nurses
American women nurses